Death in the Garden, Blood on the Flowers is the second full-length release from Los Angeles indie band Irving, released in 2006.

The title track was used in a Totino's Mega Pizza Rolls commercial which began airing in early 2007.

Track listing
"The Gentle Preservation of Children's Minds" - 4:21
"She's Not Shy" - 4:40
"Jen, Nothing Matters to Me" - 3:43
"Death in the Garden, Blood on the Flowers" - 3:32
"I'll Write the Song, You Sing for Me" - 3:50
"The Longest Day in the Afternoon" - 4:31 
"Situation" - 4:09 
"I Want to Love You in My Room" - 3:19
"Care, I Don't Care" - 3:41 
"If You Say Jump, I Will Say No" - 4:19 
"Lovely, Just Like Her" - 3:54 
"Hard To Breathe" - 2:59 
"The Look of Flowers That Are Looked At" - 4:36
(Bonus track on Japanese CD: 'This Life Is A Lonely Place')

2006 albums
Albums produced by Phil Ek
Irving (band) albums